Damien McGarry is an Australian former professional rugby league footballer who played in the 1980s and 1990s. He played for Western Suburbs, Balmain Tigers and St. George Dragons in the NSWRL/ARL competition and for Hull F.C. in England.

Playing career
McGarry made his first grade debut for Balmain in round 4 of the 1988 NSWRL season against Western Suburbs at Leichhardt Oval. In the 1990 NSWRL season, McGarry scored nine tries in twelve matches for Balmain. McGarry would then sign a contract to join English side Hull F.C. and played in the clubs 1990–91 Rugby League Premiership final victory over Widnes. McGarry then returned to Australia and played for Western Suburbs and St. George.

References

1968 births
Western Suburbs Magpies players
Balmain Tigers players
Hull F.C. players
St. George Dragons players
Australian rugby league players
Rugby league wingers
Rugby league centres
Living people